This is a list of electoral districts or ridings in Canada for the Canadian federal election of 1953, 1957, 1958, 1962, 1963, and 1965. For the first time, each of Canada's territories would return one member each, instead of one member for both.

Electoral Districts are constituencies that elect Members of Parliament in Canada's House of Commons every election.

Newfoundland – 7 seats
Bonavista—Twillingate
Burin—Burgeo
Grand Falls—White Bay—Labrador
Humber—St. George's
St. John's East
St. John's West
Trinity—Conception

Nova Scotia – 12 seats
Antigonish—Guysborough
Cape Breton North and Victoria
Cape Breton South
Colchester—Hants
Cumberland
Digby—Annapolis—Kings
Halifax*
Inverness—Richmond
Pictou
Queens—Lunenburg
Shelburne—Yarmouth—Clare

Prince Edward Island – 4 seats
King's
Prince
Queen's*

New Brunswick – 10 seats
Charlotte
Gloucester
Kent
Northumberland (renamed Northumberland-Miramichi in 1955)
Restigouche—Madawaska
Royal
St. John—Albert
Victoria—Carleton
Westmorland
York—Sunbury

Quebec – 75 seats
Argenteuil—Deux-Montagnes
Beauce
Beauharnois—Salaberry
Bellechasse
Berthier—Maskinongé—delanaudière
Bonaventure
Brome—Missisquoi
Cartier
Chambly—Rouville
Champlain
Chapleau
Charlevoix
Châteauguay—Huntingdon—Laprairie
Chicoutimi
Compton—Frontenac
Dollard
Dorchester
Drummond—Arthabaska
Gaspé
Gatineau
Hochelaga
Hull
Îles-de-la-Madeleine 
Jacques Cartier—Lasalle
Joliette—L'Assomption—Montcalm
Kamouraska
Labelle
Lac-Saint-Jean
Lafontaine
Lapointe
Laurier
Laval
Lévis
Longueuil
Lotbinière
Maisonneuve—Rosemont
Matapédia—Matane
Mégantic
Mercier
Montmagny—L'Islet
Mount Royal
Nicolet—Yamaska
Notre-Dame-de-Grâce
Outremont—St-Jean
Papineau
Pontiac—Témiscamingue
Portneuf
Quebec East
Quebec South
Quebec West
Québec—Montmorency
Richelieu—Verchères
Richmond—Wolfe
Rimouski
Roberval
Saguenay
Saint-Antoine—Westmount
Saint-Denis
Saint-Henri
Saint-Hyacinthe—Bagot
Saint-Jacques
Saint-Jean—Iberville—Napierville
Saint-Maurice—Laflèche
Sainte-Marie
Shefford
Sherbrooke
St. Ann
St. Lawrence—St. George
Stanstead
Témiscouata (renamed Rivière-du-Loup—Témiscouata in 1959)
Terrebonne
Trois-Rivières
Vaudreuil—Soulanges
Verdun
Villeneuve

Ontario – 85 seats
Algoma East
Algoma West
Brant—Haldimand
Brantford
Broadview
Bruce
Carleton
Cochrane
Danforth
Davenport
Dufferin—Simcoe
Durham
Eglinton
Elgin
Essex East
Essex South
Essex West
Fort William
Glengarry—Prescott
Greenwood
Grenville—Dundas
Grey North
Grey—Bruce
Halton
Hamilton East
Hamilton South
Hamilton West
Hastings South
Hastings—Frontenac
High Park
Huron
Kenora—Rainy River
Kent
Kingston
Lambton West
Lambton—Kent
Lanark
Leeds
Lincoln
London
Middlesex East
Middlesex West
Niagara Falls
Nickel Belt
Nipissing
Norfolk
Northumberland
Ontario
Ottawa East
Ottawa West
Oxford
Parkdale
Parry Sound—Muskoka
Peel
Perth
Peterborough West
Port Arthur
Prince Edward—Lennox
Renfrew North
Renfrew South
Rosedale
Russell
Simcoe East
Simcoe North
Spadina
St. Paul's
Stormont
Sudbury
Timiskaming
Timmins
Trinity
Victoria
Waterloo North
Waterloo South
Welland
Wellington South
Wellington—Huron
Wentworth
York Centre
York East
York North
York South
York West
York—Humber
York—Scarborough

Manitoba – 14 seats
Brandon—Souris
Churchill
Dauphin
Lisgar
Marquette
Portage—Neepawa
Provencher
Selkirk
Springfield
St. Boniface
Winnipeg North
Winnipeg North Centre
Winnipeg South
Winnipeg South Centre

Saskatchewan – 17 seats
Assiniboia
Humboldt—Melfort (renamed Humboldt—Melfort—Tisdale in 1961)
Kindersley
Mackenzie
Meadow Lake
Melville
Moose Jaw—Lake Centre
Moose Mountain
Prince Albert
Qu'Appelle
Regina City
Rosetown—Biggar
Rosthern
Saskatoon
Swift Current—Maple Creek (Swift Current prior to 1953)
The Battlefords
Yorkton

Alberta – 17 seats
Acadia
Athabaska
Battle River—Camrose
Bow River
Calgary North
Calgary South
Edmonton East
Edmonton West
Edmonton—Strathcona
Jasper—Edson
Lethbridge
Macleod
Medicine Hat
Peace River
Red Deer
Vegreville
Wetaskiwin

British Columbia – 22 seats
Burnaby—Coquitlam
Burnaby—Richmond
Cariboo
Coast-Capilano
Comox—Alberni
Esquimalt—Saanich
Fraser Valley
Kamloops
Kootenay East
Kootenay West
Nanaimo (renamed Nanaimo—Cowichan—The Islands in 1962)
New Westminster
Okanagan Boundary
Okanagan—Revelstoke
Skeena
Vancouver Centre
Vancouver East
Vancouver Kingsway
Vancouver Quadra
Vancouver South
Vancouver—Burrard
Victoria

Northwest Territories – 1 seat
Mackenzie River (merged into Northwest Territories in 1962)

Yukon – 1 seat
Yukon
*returned two members

External links
Riding map

1952-1966